was a junior college in Shimonoseki Yamaguchi Prefecture, Japan, and was part of the Baiko Gakuin network.

 The Junior College was founded in 1964 as Baiko Jo Gakuin University Junior College.
 In 1975 Its name was changed to  Baiko Jo Gakuin University Junior College.
 In 2001 Its name was changed to Baiko Gakuin University Women's Junior College.
 In 2006 The Junior College was closed.

Universities and colleges in Yamaguchi Prefecture
Educational institutions established in 1964
Japanese junior colleges
Shimonoseki
Private universities and colleges in Japan
1964 establishments in Japan